These are the official results of the Women's 10 km Walk event at the 1991 World Championships in Tokyo, Japan. There were a total number of 42 participating athletes, with the final held on Saturday August 24, 1991, with the start at 10:25h local time.

Medalists

Intermediates

Final ranking

See also
 1987 Women's World Championships 10km Walk (Rome)
 1990 Women's European Championships 10km Walk (Split)
 1992 Women's Olympic 10km Walk (Barcelona)
 1993 Women's World Championships 10km Walk (Stuttgart)
 1994 Men's European Championships 10km Walk (Helsinki)

References
 Results
 Die Leichtathletik-Statistik-Seite

W
Racewalking at the World Athletics Championships
1991 in women's athletics